The 1983–84 VfL Bochum season was the 46th season in club history.

Review and events

Matches

Legend

Bundesliga

DFB-Pokal

Squad

Squad and statistics

Squad, appearances and goals scored

|}

Transfers

Summer

In:

Out:

Winter

In:

Out:

VfL Bochum II

|}

Sources

External links
 1983–84 VfL Bochum season at Weltfussball.de 
 1983–84 VfL Bochum season at kicker.de 
 1983–84 VfL Bochum season at Fussballdaten.de 

Bochum
VfL Bochum seasons